Honor Roll may refer to:

Honor roll, a list of honors students
Honor Rolls of Baseball, established in 1946
Honour Roll Clasp, a decoration of Nazi Germany during World War II 
The Honor Roll, a band later known as We Shot the Moon

See also
Honor Roll Murder, the murder of Stuart Tay
Roll of Honour (disambiguation)
Tasmanian Honour Roll of Women, an Australian register that honours the achievements of women in the state of Tasmania
Victorian Honour Roll of Women, an Australian register that honours the achievements of women in the state of Victoria